Vehicle weight is a measurement of wheeled motor vehicles; either an actual measured weight of the vehicle under defined conditions or a gross weight rating for its weight carrying capacity.

Curb or kerb weight
Curb weight (U.S. English) or kerb weight (British English) is the total mass of a vehicle with standard equipment and all necessary operating consumables such as motor oil, transmission oil, brake fluid, coolant, air conditioning refrigerant, and sometimes a full tank of fuel, while not loaded with either passengers or cargo. The gross vehicle weight is larger and includes the maximum payload of passengers and cargo. 

This definition may differ from definitions used by governmental regulatory agencies or other organizations. For example, many European Union manufacturers include the weight of a  driver and luggage to follow European Directive 95/48/EC. Organizations may also define curb weight with fixed levels of fuel and other variables to equalize the value for the comparison of different vehicles. 

The United States Environmental Protection Agency regulations define curb weight as follows:  Curb weight means the actual or the manufacturer's estimated weight of the vehicle in operational status with all standard equipment, and weight of fuel at nominal tank capacity, and the weight of optional equipment computed  in accordance with §86.1832–01; incomplete light-duty trucks shall have the curb weight specified by the manufacturer.

For a motorcycle, wet weight is the equivalent term.

Dry weight

Dry weight is the weight of a vehicle without any consumables, passengers, or cargo. It is significantly less than the weight of a vehicle in a driveable condition and therefore rarely used. Quoting a dry weight can make a car's weight and power-to-weight figures appear far more favorable than those of rival cars using curb weight.

The difference between dry weight and curb weight depends on many variables such as the capacity of the fuel tank. There is no standard for dry weight, so it's open to interpretations.

Some vehicle manufacturers have used the term shipping weight, which refers to the vehicle in as-built, no-option condition. This would include engine oil, coolant, brake fluid and at least some small quantity of fuel, as vehicles have traditionally been driven off the assembly line and these fluids were necessary to do so.

Motorcycles

The dry weight of a motorcycle excludes some or all of the following:  gasoline (or other fuel), engine oil, coolant, brake fluid, or battery.

There is no standardized way to test the dry weight of a motorcycle.  Inconsistencies will almost always be found between a motorcycle manufacturer's published dry weight and motorcycle press and media outlet's published dry weight. This is due to different testing techniques, differences in what is being excluded, and a lack of defining how testing was conducted by the organization doing the testing.

Gross weight ratings

Gross vehicle weight rating

The gross vehicle weight rating (GVWR), or gross vehicle mass (GVM), is the maximum operating weight/mass of a vehicle as specified by the manufacturer including the vehicle's chassis, body, engine, engine fluids, fuel, accessories, driver, passengers and cargo but excluding that of any trailers.

The weight of a vehicle is influenced by passengers, cargo, even fuel level, so a number of terms are used to express the weight of a vehicle in a designated state. Gross combined weight rating (GCWR) refers to the total mass of a vehicle including all trailers. GVWR and GCWR are used to specify weight limitations and restrictions. Gross trailer weight rating specifies the maximum weight of a trailer and the gross axle weight rating specifies the maximum weight on any particular axle.

Australia
Beyond this, a different class of licence is required. A vehicle with a GVM up to 4,500 kg is termed a light vehicle, while those over 4,500 kg are termed heavy vehicles.

Many models of small trucks are manufactured to have a GVM rating of  but sold with the option of a GVM of just under 4,500 kg so that they can be driven on a car licence. 

Many minor roads, including some in rural areas and some in suburban areas, have GVM restrictions such as 5,000 kg or 8,000 kg. These restrictions may be applied for technical reasons such as load limited bridges, or as a method of reducing the number of heavy vehicles on local roads.

United Kingdom
A standard car driving licence issued by an EU country (i.e. class B) limits the licence-holder to driving vehicles with a "maximum authorised mass" (i.e. This includes holders of UK class B driving licences who passed their driving tests on or after 1 January 1997.

Anyone looking to drive a heavy goods vehicle (i.e. any vehicle other than those used for passenger transport) with a GVWR of over  must obtain a class C licence. Anyone looking to drive any vehicle with a GVWR of up to  must obtain a class C1 licence. Anyone with a class C licence can drive class C1 vehicles.

United States
Vehicles over 6,000 lb are restricted from some city roadways, although it is not always clear if this restriction is for actual curb weight or GVWR.

Vehicles or combinations with a GVWR over  generally require a Commercial Driver License (CDL) or a Non-Commercial Class "A" or "B" license. A CDL is also required for certain vehicles under 26,000 lb GVWR, such as buses and for-hire passenger vehicles of 16 or more passengers, all vehicles transporting placarded hazardous materials or wastes regardless of weight or load class, and any vehicle towing a trailer with a Gross Trailer Weight over  where the combined weight is greater than 26,000 lbs.

Laws vary from state to state, but typically vehicles over 10,000 lb are required to stop at weigh stations. Sometimes large passenger or non-commercial vehicles such as RVs are exempt from this. Additionally, many states use the GVWR for registration purposes, where over a certain weight such as 8,000 lb, a mill rate is applied to the GVWR to arrive at a registration fee.

Labeling
On vehicles designed for the North American market, the GVWR can be found alongside other vehicle technical specifications on the Vehicle ID Plate that is usually located on the interior of the B-pillar according to U.S. or Canadian Federal Motor Vehicle Safety Standards (inside the driver's door, near the door latch).

Most U.S. and Australian commercial trucks are required by licensing authorities to have this information printed on the outside of the vehicle, and for it to be clearly visible from a specified distance.

Gross trailer weight rating
The gross trailer weight rating (GTWR) is the total mass of a road trailer that is loaded to capacity, including the weight of the trailer itself, plus fluids and cargo, that a vehicle is rated to tow by the manufacturer.   In the United States and Canada, the static tongue load, the weight of the trailer as measured at the trailer coupling, is generally recommended to be 10–15% of the GTWR.

In the United States and Canada, there are four main weight classes of trailer hitches as defined by the Society of Automotive Engineers (SAE):
Class I – rated to 
Class II – rated to 
Class III – rated to 
Class IV – rated to

Gross combined weight rating
The gross combined weight rating or gross combination weight rating (GCWR), also referred to as the gross combination mass (GCM), gross train weight (GTW), is the maximum allowable combined mass of a road vehicle, the passengers and cargo in the tow vehicle, plus the mass of the trailer and cargo in the trailer. This rating is set by the vehicle manufacturer.

The GCWR is a function of the torque output of the engine, the capacity and ratios of the transmission, the capacity of the driving axles and tires, the capacity of the radiator, and the ability of the chassis to withstand that torque.

Gross axle weight rating

The gross axle weight rating (GAWR) is the maximum distributed weight that may be supported by an axle of a road vehicle. Typically, GAWR is followed by either the letters FR or RR, which indicate front or rear axles respectively.

Importance
Road damage rises steeply with axle weight, and is estimated "as a rule of thumb... for reasonably strong pavement surfaces" to be proportional to the fourth power of the axle weight. This means that doubling the axle weight will increase road damage (2x2x2x2)=16 times. For this reason, trucks with a high axle weight are heavily taxed in most countries.

Examples of GAWR on common axles:

Maximum weight laws
In the EU and U.S. legal maximum load restrictions are placed on weight, independent of the manufacturer's rating. In the EU a tractor can generally have  on a single axle, with suspension type and number of tires often allowing slightly higher loads. The primary factor is distance between axle centerlines, also used to measure bridge formulas. A bridge formula does not reduce axle load allowance, rather gross vehicle weight (GVW), which can affect load distribution and actual axle weights.

References

See also
Vehicular metrics
Vehicle size class
Mass
Vehicle technology